Love and the Philosopher is a 1923 novel by the British writer Marie Corelli.

References

Bibliography
 Ayres, Brenda & Maier, Sarah E. . Reinventing Marie Corelli for the Twenty-First Century. Anthem Press, 2019.
 Vinson, James. Twentieth-Century Romance and Gothic Writers. Macmillan, 1982.

1923 British novels
Novels by Marie Corelli